Elizabeth of Moravia   (German: Elisabeth von Mähren, Czech: Alžběta Moravská, Upper Sorbian: Hilžbjeta Morawska, c. 1355 – 20 November 1400) was the second daughter and third issue of John Henry of Moravia, (great-grandson of Přemysl II, Otakar, King of Bohemia) and his second wife Margaret of Opava. She became Margravine consort of Meissen by her marriage to William I, Margrave of Meissen (1366).

Elizabeth was buried in Prince's Chapel of Meissen Cathedral.

Marriage 
Elizabeth was married to William I, House of Wettin in Meissen, spring 1366.
The couple had no children.

Names in other languages

Titles 
Margravine of Meissen.

Ancestors

See also
 Margraviate of Moravia
 Jobst of Moravia
 Špilberk Castle
 Moravia

References 

1355 births
1400 deaths
Margraves of Meissen
House of Wettin
House of Luxembourg
14th-century German women